Faristenia hirowatarii is a moth in the family Gelechiidae. It is found in Japan (Honshu).

The length of the forewings is 5.6-6.9 mm for males and 5.7-7.2 mm for females. The forewings are whitish, scattered with pale fuscous and with a blackish dot on the costa at the base. There are five fuscous marks on the costa, as well as a fuscous dot on the subcosta near the base and a fuscous dot at two-thirds. There are irregular fuscous streaks on the plical fold and the tornus is somewhat suffused with pale fuscous. A series of fuscous dots is found on the margin from. The hindwings are light grey, irrorated with pale brownish grey.

References

Faristenia
Moths described in 2012